Waugoola Shire was a local government area in the South West Slopes region of New South Wales, Australia. Waugoola Shire was established in 7 March 1906.

The Shire was merged with the Municipality of Cowra to form Cowra Shire on 1 January 1981 per the Local Government Areas Amalgamation Act 1980.

References

Further reading

Former local government areas of New South Wales
1906 establishments in Australia
1981 disestablishments in Australia
Cowra